General elections were held in Papua New Guinea between 18 June and 9 July 1977, the first since independence from Australia in 1975. The Pangu Party led by Prime Minister Michael Somare emerged as the largest in the National Parliament. Somare subsequently formed a coalition government with the People's Progress Party (PPP) and several independent MPs. Voter turnout was 60.3%.

Background
The usual four-year term of the House of Assembly was extended to five years shortly before independence, pushing back elections to the renamed National Parliament from 1976 to mid-1977. However, in June 1976 Prime Minister Michael Somare proposed holding early elections in November 1976. Although the proposal was approved by a vote of 45 to 40 in parliament, at least half of the 104 MPs were required to vote in favour for the motion to pass. Prior to the elections, the electoral system was changed from single transferable vote to first-past-the-post.

Campaign
Just under 900 candidates contested the elections, with between two and 21 candidates in each constituency. Ten candidates were women. Polling in the Abau Open constituency was postponed due to the death of a candidate.

Results
Three women – Nahau Rooney, Waliyato Clowes and Josephine Abaijah – were elected, a number not repeated until 2012. Nine ministers lost their seats, a number that increased to ten when Reuben Taureka was defeated in the delayed contest in Abau.

Following the elections, most of the independents joined parties at the first sitting of parliament, with Pangu gaining a further ten seats, the PPP four and Papua Besena and the United Party one, leaving eleven members sitting as independents.

Aftermath
Following the elections, Michael Somare was elected Prime Minister, defeating John Guise (who was supported by the United Party) by 69 votes to 36. Somare established a coalition government of the Pangu Party, the People's Progress Party and some independent members, forming an 18-member cabinet. Kingsford Dibela was elected Speaker and Tei Abal of the United Party became Leader of the Opposition.

Later in 1977, Somare appointed four additional ministers; Yano Belo (PPP) as Minister for Works and Supply, Thomas Kavali (Independent) as Minister for Housing, Karl Kitchens as Minister for Minerals and Energy and Nahau Rooney (Independent) as Minister for Corrective Institutions and Liquor Licensing. Rooney became the first woman to hold a cabinet portfolio in Papua New Guinea.

See also
Members of the National Parliament of Papua New Guinea, 1977–1982

References

Related links
Centre on Democratic Performance Election Results Archive

Elections in Papua New Guinea
Papua
General
National Parliament of Papua New Guinea
Election and referendum articles with incomplete results